The 112th Pennsylvania House of Representatives District is located in Lackawanna County and includes the following areas:

 Archbald
 Blakely
 Carbondale
 Carbondale Township
 Dunmore
 Fell Township
 Jefferson Township
 Jermyn
 Jessup
 Mayfield
 Olyphant
 Throop
 Vandling

Representatives

References

Government of Lackawanna County, Pennsylvania
112